"Teresa" is a song by Irish singer Joe Dolan. The song written by  Albert Hammond and Mike Hazlewood and produced by Geoffrey Everitt. It was released in 1969 becoming an international hit for Dolan.

Charts
The song peaked at number 1 on the Irish Singles Chart and number 20 on the UK Singles Chart. It also reached number 6 on the Belgian Ultratop chart and number 38 on the German Singles Chart.

References

Joe Dolan songs
Songs written by Albert Hammond
Songs written by Mike Hazlewood